Jay Warren (born 4 May 1989) is a Tahitian footballer who plays as a midfielder for A.S. Pirae in the Tahiti Ligue 1.

References

1989 births
Living people
French Polynesian footballers
Association football midfielders
Tahiti international footballers
A.S. Pirae players
2016 OFC Nations Cup players